In Odia and Sanskrit, Besha means dress or adornment. Lord Jagannath and his siblings are adorned with different beshas throughout the year. Out of all beshas of lord Jagannath and his siblings, the Suna Besha, are held several times during a year. The all beshas of lord Jagannath and his siblings are listed below :

List of Besha with tithi

Gallery

References

Jagannath
Observances in India
Observances in Bangladesh
Lists of observances